Kayacan Erdoğan (born 21 March 1988) is a Turkish footballer who plays as a goalkeeper for Ankara Keçiörengücü.

External links
 
 

1988 births
Sportspeople from Eskişehir
Living people
Turkish footballers
Association football goalkeepers
Eskişehirspor footballers
Kayserispor footballers
Giresunspor footballers
Büyükşehir Belediye Erzurumspor footballers
Ankara Keçiörengücü S.K. footballers
Süper Lig players
TFF First League players